José Gerardo Álvarez-Vázquez (aka: El Indio or El Chayán) is a Mexican drug trafficker who worked for the Beltrán-Leyva Cartel and then for Édgar Valdez Villarreal's criminal organization known as Los Negros. In 2008, the United States government offered a $2 million reward for his capture.

Drug trafficking
According to Mexican federal authorities, Álvarez Vázquez presumably controlled the transport of drugs in the State of Mexico as well in the state of Guerrero. It is said that he fought for the leadership for the organization against Héctor Beltrán Leyva and Sergio Villarreal Barragán with the help of Edgar Valdez Villarreal. He was also in charge of some routes for the transport of drugs to the U.S. on behalf of the Beltrán Leyva and Sinaloa Cartels.

Kingpin Act sanction
On 2 October 2008, the United States Department of the Treasury sanctioned Álvarez Vázquez under the Foreign Narcotics Kingpin Designation Act (sometimes referred to simply as the "Kingpin Act"), for his involvement in drug trafficking along with nine other international criminals and six entities. The act prohibited U.S. citizens and companies from doing any kind of business activity with him, and virtually froze all his assets in the U.S.

Capture
On April 21, 2010, the Mexican military raided a household in Huixquilucan; during the raid, troops were met with gunfire from cartel gunmen. After the gunfight, soldiers cordoned off the zone which led to the capture of Gerardo Alvarez-Vázquez.

References

Beltrán-Leyva Cartel traffickers
Mexican drug traffickers
Living people
People sanctioned under the Foreign Narcotics Kingpin Designation Act
Year of birth missing (living people)